Prinzessin Brambilla (Princess Brambilla), Op. 12b, is an opera in a prologue and five scenes by Walter Braunfels. The German libretto, written by the composer, is based on the novella  by E. T. A. Hoffmann published in 1820.

Composition history
Braunfels began the composition in 1906 and completed the original two-act version in 1908. He revised the opera in 1929/1930. The second version consists of a prologue and five scenes separated by orchestral interludes. The score of this revised version is published by Universal Edition AG Vienna .

Performance history
The opera was first performed in its original two-act version on 25 March 1909 at the Stuttgart Court Theatre with Max von Schillings conducting.

Roles

Recordings
In 2005 Marco Polo released a live recording, made during the October 2004 Wexford Festival Opera production run, with Daniele Belardinelli conducting the Cracow Philharmonic Orchestra. The principal roles were sung by Enrico Marabelli (Pantalone), Peter Paul (Prince Bastaniello), Eric Shaw (Claudio) and Elena Lo Forte (Giazinta).

Notes

Operas by Walter Braunfels
1909 operas
Operas set in Italy
German-language operas
Operas
Operas based on works by E. T. A. Hoffmann